DAT A/S, formerly named Danish Air Transport, is a Danish airline headquartered in Vamdrup, Kolding Municipality, operating scheduled and chartered passenger and cargo flights mainly from airports in Denmark.

History
DAT was founded as Danish Air Transport and started operations in 1989, initially as a cargo airline. Soon special operations like the transport of live horses or supplies for the Paris Dakar Rally in Africa were offered, too. Passenger charter flights were added in 1994, with the subsequent launch of scheduled services on 18 November, 1996. 

Since 2003, DAT also owns DAT LT which has a single ATR aircraft and operates under its own AOC. Prior to 2020, the airline changed its legal name and brand from Danish Air Transport to the abbreviated DAT.

In September 2021, DAT retired their sole McDonnell Douglas MD-83 which was the last aircraft of its type operated in Europe.

In January 2023, DAT received criticism for their participation in the deportation of refugees.

Destinations
As of April 2022, DAT operates scheduled passenger flights to the following destinations. Some more destinations are served as leisure or freight charters as well as on behalf of other airlines.

DAT was also awarded (PSO) routes in Sicily, Italy, operated under the brand Volidisicilia. The contract ran from July 1, 2018, through June 30, 2022.

Fleet

As of January 2023, the DAT fleet consists of the following aircraft:

References

External links

Official website

Airlines of Denmark
Companies based in Kolding Municipality
European Regions Airline Association
Airlines established in 1989
1989 establishments in Denmark